Strange Charm is the eighth solo studio album by English musician Gary Numan, originally released in November 1986, it was Numan's third release on his self-owned Numa Records label. The album was not released in the United States until 1999 when it was issued in a digitally remastered form with five bonus tracks by Cleopatra Records. In the same year it was also reissued with bonus tracks in the United Kingdom by Eagle Records.

Background, production and recording
Strange Charm was the last studio album released on his self-owned Numa Records label before he signed a recording contract with I.R.S. Records (he would later release two more studio albums on Numa in the 1990s). Unlike most of his previous studio albums, Strange Charm is a fragmented release with no obvious theme on it, either musically or lyrically. The majority of the album was produced by the Wave Team, who had produced most of Numan's previous offering, The Fury (1985), and continued in a style similar to the previous studio album (with liberal use of saxophone and female backing vocals). However, the album's stand-out tracks, "My Breathing" and "New Thing from London Town", were produced by Ade Orange and Bill Sharpe and Nick Smith, respectively, and offer a departure from the industrial sound of the rest of the album into quite different atmospheres. "New Thing from London Town" was a re-recorded version of the single released by Numan and Bill Sharpe (under the name Sharpe + Numan) a month before the release of Strange Charm. The Strange Charm version of the song retains the original music, but features new lyrics written and sung by Numan (the lyrics on the single version were written by Roger Odell). Elsewhere, the songs on Strange Charm range from radio-friendly pop ("The Sleeproom", "I Can't Stop") to slow-burning ballads "This Is Love"), to fast-paced, energetic synth-rock (the title-track).

By the time of Strange Charms recording, Numan had found himself more and more alienated from the mainstream of British pop music, while most of the money he had made during the early part of his career had now been consumed by his costly self-funded record label. Numan later recollected that the studio atmosphere was tense:

Not only did Numan find it very difficult to create the kind of sound that he wanted for Strange Charm, but the protracted recording sessions resulted in the album being recorded in its entirety twice, diluting Numan's enthusiasm for the finished product. Strange Charm was finally released in late 1986, many months after singles from the album had been released. "This Is Love" was released in April and peaked at No. 28 on the UK Singles Chart; "I Can't Stop" was released in June and reached No. 27, and the original version of "New Thing from London Town" was released in October and reached No. 52. No singles were taken from Strange Charm after the album's release in November. The only single Numan released that month was "I Still Remember", a remake of a song from Numan's previous studio album The Fury (1985). Released as a charity single for the RSPCA, "I Still Remember" reached No. 74 on the UK Singles Chart. The Strange Charm album itself peaked at No. 59 on the UK Albums Chart, and spent only two weeks in the Top 75.

For the visual look of Strange Charm, Numan abandoned the white suit-clad persona of The Fury and instead dyed his hair blond (again) and wore a Blade Runner-esque long leather jacket and sunglasses. Blade Runner was also the influence for one of the B-sides of the album, "Time to Die", which takes its title and most of its lyrical content from Roy Batty's dying speech during the climax scene of the film. Strange Charm is the third of five Numan studio albums to feature saxophonist Dick Morrissey, who performed on the Blade Runner (1982) film score. Vocal samples from the film can also be heard on Numan's studio albums The Fury (1985) and Outland (1991). Numan has referred to Blade Runner as "one of my all-time favourite films."

Numan did not support Strange Charm with a live tour (making it his first studio album since 1981's Dance not to be supported by a concert tour). However, Numan embarked on the 18-date "Exhibition Tour" in September 1987 to promote the compilation album Exhibition. A live album, Ghost, was culled from the final two shows of the tour (25–26 September 1987) and released in March 1988. Ghost features live versions of several Strange Charm tracks.

Different releases
Strange Charm was originally released exclusively in the UK. The original cassette release featured "Time to Die" as an extra track at the end of side one. The album saw its first CD reissue on Numan's own Numa label in 1991. It was reissued again in 1996. In 1999 the album was reissued in the UK by Eagle Records in remastered form, with five tracks originally released as B-sides as bonus tracks (including "Time to Die"), new artwork and liner notes. In the same year it was also released in the US by Cleopatra Records, who dropped two of the instrumental bonus tracks of the UK reissue in favour of the extended mixes of "New Thing from London Town" and "I Can't Stop". Additionally the US release used a modified version of the original cover and did not feature liner notes.

Track listing
All tracks written by Gary Numan, except for "New Thing from London Town", which has music by Bill Sharpe and lyrics by Numan.1986 release"My Breathing" – 6:39
"Unknown and Hostile" – 4:29
"The Sleeproom" – 5:19
"New Thing from London Town" – 5:57
"I Can't Stop" – 5:50
"Strange Charm" – 5:03
"The Need" – 7:07
"This Is Love" – 4:32

 The original cassette release included "Time to Die" as an extra track on side one, after "New Thing from London Town".1999 Cleopatra US CD reissue (CLP 0534-2)"My Breathing" – 6:36
"Unknown and Hostile" – 4:31
"The Sleeproom" – 5:19
"New Thing from London Town" – 5:56
"I Can't Stop" – 5:48
"Strange Charm" – 5:00
"The Need" – 7:07
"This Is Love" – 4:31
"New Thing from London Town" (12" Version) – 7:57
"Time to Die" – 4:19
"I Can't Stop" (10" Version) – 6:38
"Faces" – 4:54
"Survival" – 5:121999 Eagle Records CD reissue (EAMCD074)"My Breathing" – 6:39
"Unknown and Hostile" – 4:29
"The Sleeproom" – 5:19
"New Thing from London Town" – 5:57
"I Can't Stop" – 5:50
"Strange Charm" – 5:03
"The Need" – 7:07
"This Is Love" – 4:32
"Survival" – 5:14
"Faces" – 4:54
"Time to Die" – 4:18
"River" – 3:32
"Mistasax (2)" – 3:08

 "River" and "Mistasax (2)" are Numan solo tracks that were used as B-sides to the Radio Heart singles "All Across the Nation" and "Radio Heart", respectively.
 "New Thing from London Town (12" Version)" is the 12" mix of the Sharpe + Numan single version, with lyrics written by Roger Odell instead of Numan. It is exclusive to the U.S. Cleopatra reissue. The original 7" mix has only ever been re-released on the 1999 Numan compilation album, New Dreams for Old: 1984–1998, and was transferred from a vinyl copy because the original master-tape of the song had been lost.

Personnel
Adapted from the Strange Charm liner notes.
 Gary Numan – vocals; keyboards; guitar
 Bill Sharpe – keyboards
 Mike Smith – keyboards
 Ade Orange – keyboards; guitar
 Russell Bell – guitar; backing vocals
 Mark Railton – guitar
 Martin Elliott – bass
 Chris Payne – violin
 Dick Morrissey – saxophone
 Ian Herron – drum machine programming
 Roger Odelle – drum programming
 Jess Lidyard – percussion on "The Need"
 Tessa Niles – backing vocals
 Linda Taylor – backing vocalsProduction and artwork'
 Gary Numan – producer; audio mixing
 The Wave Team – producers
 Ade Orange – producer
 Bill Sharpe – producer
 Nick Smith – producer
 Tim Summerhayes – engineer
 Arun Chekraverty – audio mastering
 Jeff Hanen – audio mastering
 Patti Burris – make-up
 Lewis Ziolek – photography

References

External links
 

Gary Numan albums
1986 albums
Cleopatra Records albums